Rufus "Jake" Crawford (March 20, 1928 – October 21, 2008) was an American professional baseball player who appeared in seven games in Major League Baseball as an outfielder and pinch hitter for the St. Louis Browns in .

After graduating from high school in his native Campbell, Missouri, Crawford attended the University of Missouri. In his first game, on the road against the Cleveland Indians, he was the starting center fielder and batted third in the St. Louis lineup. He struck out against Cleveland starter Steve Gromek in the first inning, then was replaced by fellow rookie Jay Porter two innings later. Crawford started two more games and appeared as a defensive replacement or pinch hitter in three others during his MLB trial. His two hits (in 11 at bats) included a double, but he struck out five times and was not credited with a run batted in. 

Crawford was traded to the Detroit Tigers on October 27, 1952, but would never again appear in a major league game. His professional career ended in 1957 after nine seasons.

Crawford was a member of the U.S. Air Force, and after his baseball career, he worked for the Fort Worth Police Department. He died on October 21, 2008.

References

External links 
 Baseball-Reference

1928 births
2008 deaths
Aberdeen Pheasants players
Baseball players from Missouri
Buffalo Bisons (minor league) players
Fort Worth Cats players
Little Rock Travelers players
Major League Baseball outfielders
Muskogee Reds players
People from Campbell, Missouri
Sacramento Solons players
St. Louis Browns players
Scranton Miners players
Vancouver Mounties players